Vítor Krieger (born 30 April 1960) is a Brazilian archer. He competed in the men's individual event at the 1992 Summer Olympics.

References

1960 births
Living people
Brazilian male archers
Olympic archers of Brazil
Archers at the 1992 Summer Olympics
Place of birth missing (living people)
20th-century Brazilian people